Julita may refer to:

 Julita, Leyte, municipality in the province of Leyte, Philippines
 Julița, a village in Vărădia de Mureș Commune, Arad County, Romania
 Julița, a tributary of the Mureș in Arad County, Romania
 Julita parish in the county of Södermanland, Sweden, site of Julita manor
 Julita Abbey (former)
 Saint Julitta or Julietta